Antonio Sangiovanni (or San Giovanni) was a 17th-century Italian agronomist and mathematician.

A nobleman from Vicenza, he wrote Seconda squara mobile, a noteworthy work in the field of geometry.

Works

References 

17th-century births
17th-century deaths
17th-century Italian male writers
17th-century Italian mathematicians
Italian agronomists